P56 may refer to:

 , a submarine of the Royal Navy
 , a patrol vessel of Indian Navy
 Northrop XP-56 Black Bullet, an American prototype fighter aircraft
 Papyrus 56, a biblical manuscript
 Percival P.56 Provost, a British trainer aircraft
 P56, a state regional road in Latvia